Vladimir Walent (born April 22, 2003) is an Haitian college soccer player who plays as a defender for Wake Forest University.

Early life 
Walent was born in Haiti but emigrated to Lafayette, Colorado as a child.

Career 
On July 31, 2020, Walent signed a USL Academy contract with Colorado Springs Switchbacks FC. He made his debut on September 9, 2020 as a substitute vs. Real Monarchs.

Ahead of the 2022 MLS Next Pro season, Walent signed a contract to play with Colorado Rapids 2. He played with the Rapids 2 until the 2022 NCAA Division I men's soccer season, where he began his collegiate career at Wake Forest University. During the 2022 season, he made 20 appearances with Wake Forest, scoring four goals and providing three assists. Walent earned 2022 ACC All-Freshman Team Selection honors at the conclusion of the 2022 Atlantic Coast Conference men's soccer season.

References

External links
Profile at US Development Academy
Profile at Colorado Springs Switchbacks
Profile at Wake Forest

2003 births
Living people
Haitian footballers
Haitian expatriate sportspeople in the United States
Expatriate soccer players in the United States
Association football defenders
American people of Haitian descent
Colorado Springs Switchbacks FC players
Colorado Rapids 2 players
Wake Forest Demon Deacons men's soccer players
People from Lafayette, Colorado
Soccer players from Colorado
MLS Next Pro players
USL Championship players